Rawhi Fattuh (also transliterated as Rauhi Fattouh; born 23 August 1949) is the former Speaker of the Palestinian Legislative Council and was the interim President of the Palestinian Authority, following the death of Yasser Arafat on 11 November 2004 until 15 January 2005. Under Palestinian law, he was to hold the post for sixty days until an election was held. The elections were held and won by Mahmoud Abbas, who was sworn in on 15 January 2005. He was elected to the Central Committee of Fatah in December 2016.

Biography
Fattuh was elected in 1996 as a representative to the Palestinian Legislative Council of the town of Rafah, (in the Gaza Strip), where he was born and has lived for most of his life. He served as secretary to the PLC until October 2003, when he became the minister of agriculture in the government of Prime Minister Ahmed Qureia.

In July 2004, Fatah nominated Fattuh as its candidate for Speaker of the Palestinian Legislative Council, with 34 Fatah delegates voting in favour and 10 against.

In November 2004, Fattuh supported Ahmed Qurei, his predecessor as speaker and former prime minister, to succeed Arafat as president.

Fattuh did not run in the 2006 legislative election and is no longer a member of the PLC.

References 

1949 births
Living people
Fatah members
Presidents of the Palestinian National Authority
Speakers of the Palestinian Legislative Council
Central Committee of Fatah members